Anders Hveem (May 10, 1924 – February 2, 2005) was a Norwegian bobsledder who competed in the 1950s. He finished 13th in the four-man event at the 1952 Winter Olympics in Oslo.

References
1952 bobsleigh four-man results
Bobsleigh four-man results: 1948-64.

Bobsledders at the 1952 Winter Olympics
Norwegian male bobsledders
1924 births
2005 deaths